Texas Hold 'em is an Xbox Live Arcade version of the popular poker variant of the same name developed by TikGames. It was released on August 23, 2006 and was the first XBLA game to be offered as a free download (for a limited time). After 48 hours, it was no longer a free download. It was also made available on the Xbox Live Arcade Unplugged Vol. 1 disc, which is available for retail purchase as well as bundled with Xbox 360 Premium consoles and Zune 3.0 firmware.

The game features three single player modes, including standard play, tournament play, and scenarios. It also supports up to eight players on Xbox Live, and now supports the Xbox Live Vision camera.

In November 2006, all players' bankrolls and the game's leaderboards were reset, in order to "eliminate inflated scores" that some players achieved as a result of exploits.

References

2006 video games
Microsoft games
Multiplayer and single-player video games
Poker video games
TikGames games
Video games developed in the United States
Xbox 360 games
Xbox 360 Live Arcade games
Xbox 360-only games